La Unión District is one of nine districts found in the province Dos de Mayo in Peru.

See also 
 Wanuku Pampa

References